Candy Corners is an unincorporated community in Eau Claire County, Wisconsin, United States. Its name is taken from the Candy Corners store, which was established by Jothan Garnett around 1888.

References 

Unincorporated communities in Eau Claire County, Wisconsin
Unincorporated communities in Wisconsin